William Miller Wallace (January 9, 1844 – November 5, 1924) was a brigadier general in the United States Army.

Biography
Wallace was born on January 9, 1844, in Prairie du Chien, Wisconsin. He married Alice Knight on January 18, 1871. Wallace died in San Francisco on November 5, 1924 and is buried with Alice at Arlington National Cemetery.

Career
Wallace originally joined the Union Army during the American Civil War. Following the war he was assigned to the 8th Infantry Regiment. Later assignments included the 6th Cavalry Regiment and the 2nd Armored Cavalry Regiment. His retirement was effective as of October 2, 1906.

References

People from Prairie du Chien, Wisconsin
Military personnel from Wisconsin
People of Wisconsin in the American Civil War
United States Army generals
Union Army soldiers
Burials at Arlington National Cemetery
1844 births
1924 deaths